Basketball at the 2001 Games of the Small States of Europe was held from 29 May to 2 June 2001. Games were played in San Marino.

In this edition, there was not women's tournament.

Medal summary

Men's tournament
Men's tournament was played by seven teams divided into two groups where the two first qualified teams would join the semifinals.

Preliminary round

Group A

Group B

Final round

Fifth position game

External links
San Marino 2001 at the Luxembourg Basketball Federation website

Small
2001 Games of the Small States of Europe
2001
International basketball competitions hosted by San Marino